Nottingham Road is a town 19 km south of Mooi River and 59 km north-west of Pietermaritzburg on the R103 road in South Africa. Founded in 1905 and named after the Nottingham Regiment which was stationed there when trouble was expected from the Basotho in the 19th century. A popular trout-fishing area.

History
Settlers from Scotland settled the area in the mid-19th century. At the end of 1885, the railway reached where the town now lies, before which the area was named after the contractor Harrison's Camp. For two years, it was known as Karkloof Station, but since Karkloof and the nearby Karkloof Forest were far away and nobody from there used the station, it was renamed Nottingham Road Station after Fort Nottingham down the road. The station started developing the area as a rural center. 

A small hotel and store were established where George Nicol's smithy would later be (now the location of the Mount West liquor store). In 1889, George Orwin bought the land where the Railway Hotel (today known as the Nottingham Road Hotel) would be built by C. Morgan and finished in 1891. In April 1884, John King donated the grounds where a small wood and iron Presbyterian church known as St. John's Gowrie would be built, and it opened in February 1885. A memorial to those from the area who lost their lives in World War I opened on the church grounds near the entrance on January 26, 1992.

The Nottingham Road Farmers' Association, one of the oldest agricultural societies in South Africa, was founded on October 26, 1887, by 11 prominent local citizens in the Railway Hotel. Their meeting hall, a longtime project, opened in December 1933. Today, it hosts the Notthingham Road Landowners' Association and a local library. The hall is used for the Association's meetings and also rented out for other functions.

In 1866, the first sheep were brought from Cape Colony via a thousand-mile overland journey. Livestock theft by local San people led to the 1869 Reprisal launched from Fort Nottingham. The campaign, which established the boundaries in the settlers' favor, was commemorated in some of the final San rock art.

Leisure
 Horse riding, polo and drag hunting are popular recreation activities in the area.
 Trout-fishing here dates to 1884.
 The Nottingham Road Brewing Company makes beer locally using traditional German methods under names such as the lager Tiddley Toad, the pale ale Whistling Weasel, the pilsner Pie-eyed Possum, and the dark brown porter Pickled Pig.
 Every May, the two-day Sherwood Medieval Festival is held in town.

References

Populated places in the uMngeni Local Municipality
Populated places established in 1905
1905 establishments in the Colony of Natal